When the Imperial Circles — comprising a regional grouping of territories of the Holy Roman Empire — were created as part of the Imperial Reform at the 1500 Diet of Augsburg, many Imperial territories remained unencircled.

They did not incorporate the territories of the Prince-electors and the Austrian homelands of the ruling House of Habsburg. Only at the 1512 Diet of Trier were these estates (except for the Kingdom of Bohemia) included in the newly implemented Burgundian, Austrian, Upper Saxon, and Electoral Rhenish circles, confirmed by the 1521 Diet of Worms.

After 1512, the bulk of the remaining territories not comprised by Imperial Circles were the lands of the Bohemian crown, the Old Swiss Confederacy and the Italian territories (the exceptions were  Savoy, Piedmont, Nice, and Aosta, which were part of the Upper Rhenish Circle). Besides these, there were also a considerable number of minor territories which retained imperial immediacy, such as individual Imperial Villages, and the lands held by individual Imperial Knights.

List of unencircled territories

Lands of the Bohemian Crown

the Kingdom of Bohemia (Bohemia proper)
the Bohemian Margraviate of Moravia
the Piast duchies of Silesia, in large part conquered by Prussia in 1742
in Lower Silesia:
the Duchy of Silesia-Wrocław, held by the Bohemian kings since 1335
the Duchy of Nysa, held by the Prince-Bishops of Wrocław
the Duchy of Legnica
the Duchy of Jawor, held by the Bohemian kings since 1392
the Duchy of Brzeg
the Duchy of Głogów
the Duchy of Żagań, held by the Saxon House of Wettin until 1549
the Duchy of Oleśnica
the Duchy of Bierutów
the Duchy of Ziębice
in Upper Silesia:
the Duchy of Opole
the Duchy of Racibórz
the Duchy of Cieszyn
the Duchy of Opava, established on Moravian territory in 1269
the Duchy of Krnov, partitioned from Opava in 1377
including the state countries of
Pszczyna
Syców
Żmigród
Milicz
Bytom Odrzański
Bytom
the Margraviates of Upper (Bautzen) and Lower Lusatia (Lübben), ceded to Saxony in 1635, including the state countries of
Muskau
Seidenberg
Hoyerswerda
Königsbrück, from 1562
the County of Kladsko, conquered by Prussia in 1742

Old Swiss Confederacy

The Old Swiss Confederacy remained part of the Holy Roman Empire until 1648, when it gained formal independence in the   Peace of Westphalia.

the Thirteen Cantons
the City of Zürich, since 1351
the City and Republic of Berne, since 1353; associate since 1323
the City of Lucerne, since 1332
Uri, founding canton (Federal Charter of 1291)
Schwyz, founding canton
Unterwalden (Obwalden and Nidwalden), founding canton
Zug, since 1352
Glarus, since 1352
the City of Fribourg, since 1481; associate since 1454
the City of Solothurn, since 1481; associate since 1353
the City of Basel, since 1501
the City of Schaffhausen, since 1501; associate since 1454
Appenzell, from 1513; associate since 1411
Associates
the City of Biel/Bienne, since 1353
the County of Neuchâtel, since 1406
the Republic of Valais, since 1416/17
Abbey of Saint Gall, since 1451
the City of St. Gallen, since 1454
the Free State of the Three Leagues since 1497/99
the City of Mühlhausen (Mulhouse), from 1515
the City of Geneva, from 1519

Italy

the Duchy of Mantua, held by the House of Gonzaga until 1708, when it passed to the Habsburgs
the Duchy of Milan, held by the House of Sforza until 1535, and then by the Habsburgs
the Duchy of Modena and Reggio, held by the House of Este
the March of Montferrat, held by the House of Palaiologos, from 1533 by the House of Gonzaga
the Duchy of Parma, from 1545, held by the House of Farnese until 1731, and then primarily by the House of Bourbon
the Republic of Florence, from 1532 the Duchy of Florence, from 1569 the Grand Duchy of Tuscany, held by the House of Medici until 1737, and then by the House of Lorraine
the Republic of Genoa
the Republic of Lucca
the Republic of Siena until 1555, when it was annexed by Florence
Other small imperial fiefs, including the Marquisate of Saluzzo, the Duchy of Guastalla, the Duchy of Mirandola, the Duchy of Massa and Carrara, the Duchy of Sabbioneta, etc.

Other territories
the territories of Imperial Knights
the Imperial Villages
minor territories, such as:
the County of Montbéliard
the Lordship of Schmalkalden
the Lordship of Jever
the peasant republic of Dithmarschen (until incorporated into Holstein in 1559)

See also 
 Rittersturm

References
 Imperial Circles in the 16th Century Historical Maps of Germany
 Nicht eingekreiste zum Heiligen Römischen Reich zugehörige Territorien und Stände

.
Subdivisions of the Holy Roman Empire
States and territories established in 1500
1500s establishments in the Holy Roman Empire
1500 establishments in Europe